The Anchor Society CIO is a Charitable Incorporated Organisation based in Bristol, England which supports older people in need in the Bristol and Bath region (BS, BA and GL Postcodes).  Its work primarily centres around grants to individuals, housing and other projects which benefit older people.

The original unincorporated Anchor Society was formed by the Whigs in 1769, when it held a dinner at the Three Tuns, a tavern on the site of the present Corn Exchange in the centre of the medieval quarter of Bristol, when 22 members were present.  Some 46 years after his death, the initial founders wished to emulate Edward Colston's philanthropy, so at this inaugural dinner the President, Gilbert Davies took up a collection for their charitable work. Initially, the Anchor Society supported 'lying-in' women and poor orphaned females to save them from prostitution. Today, the charity focuses its attention on helping older people in need.

The Anchor Society is closely aligned with the Dolphin Society and the Grateful Society, both of which also help older people in the greater Bristol area. All three societies also gather in mid-November to celebrate their charitable work at an annual service of thanksgiving.

Since its inception, there has been an unbroken record of Presidents' annual appointments and personal collections in support of the charity's work.

Past Presidents and annual collections
1769 Gilbert Davies - £12
1770 Gilbert Davies  - £35
1771 John Fowle  - £46
1772 John Rowland - £80
1773 Dr. Andrew Paterson  - £86
1774  Dr. John Wright -  £121
1787 James Harvey - £290
1789 Robert Claxton - £350
1791 John Harris - £361
1800 Samuel Span - £284
1814 Brooke Smith - £360
1820 Micheal Hinton Castle - £374
1840 Frederick Ricketts  - £536
1841 Richard Ash  - £441
1843 F.H.F. Berkeley, M.P.  - £619
1859 Elisha Smith Robinson - £510
1866 William Henry Wills, 1st Baron Winterstoke  - £634
1867 George Wills  - £576
1868 Lewis Fry - £1,022
1878 Samuel Day Wills  - £915
1880 Sir Edward Payson Wills Bt. K.C.B. - £941
1881 Francis J.Fry  - £1,003
1882 Sir Frederick Wills Bt - £1,011
1883 Charles Townsend -  £946
1887 Edward Robinson  - £1,035
1891 Sir Frank William Wills Kt. - £1,054
1892 Sir William Howell Davis - £1,070
1895 Walter Melville Wills  - £1,020
1898 Sir Herbert Ashman Bt. - £1,315
1921 Percy Steadman  - £1,851
1922 Alderman George Bryant Britton, M.P. - £1,426
1930 W.H.Eyles - £1,212
1931 H.C.Lenard - £1,389
1936 Dr. J. Odery Symes - £1,726
1935 Harold G.Robinson - £2,017
1939 T.Thornton Wills - £1,463
1940 Sir Seymour Williams - £1,158
1941 Colonel E.W.Lennard - £1,643
1945 F.M.Arkle - £2,263
1946 J.H.Britton, C.B.E - £2,231
1947 Brig. A.W.L.Newth, C.B.E, D.S.O, M.C. - £2,306
1954 J.B.Steadman - £4,102
1961 J.A.Seymour-Williams - £3,429
1966 Andrew Breach C.B.E. - £4,781
1968 H.P. Lucas - £6,108
1967 Sir John Partridge, K.B.E. - £5,775
1969 Henry Hugh Arthur Fitzroy Somerset, 10th Duke of Beaufort - £10,056
1976 D.A.Newton - £10,695
1977 Patrick Seager Hill, T.D. -  £9,490
1978 Micheal Collings - £12,362
1979 Paul Watling - £9,552
1980 J.G.S.Young - £15,645
1981 R.A.Garret C.B.E. - £12,807
1983 Norman Ricketts, O.B.E - £21,060
1985 J.R.Pool M.B.E. - £28,174
1986 His Honour Judge J.A.Cox - £23,339
1990 F.A. Avery - £50,269
1994 Robert Durie O.B.E. - £71,686
1999 John Burke O.B.E - £95,656
2003 Sir David James Vernon Wills, 5th Baronet - £74,225
2015 Canon Dr. John Savage C.B.E. - £83,067
2016 Bob Reeves LL.D - £100,897
2017 Dr John Manley - £103,186
2018 Professor Steve West CBE DL - £108,774
2019 Dr Ros Kennedy - £104,763
2020 Francis Montagu - £109,312

References

External links 

The Anchor Society
The Grateful Society
The Dolphin Society

Charities based in Bristol
Organizations established in 1759